The 1997 NFL Draft was the procedure by which National Football League teams selected amateur college football players. It is officially known as the NFL Annual Player Selection Meeting. The draft was held April 19–20, 1997, at the Paramount Theatre at Madison Square Garden in New York City, New York. No teams chose to claim any players in the supplemental draft this year.

This draft was notable for its high-profile offensive linemen. The first overall selection was Orlando Pace, who appeared in seven consecutive Pro Bowls from 2000 to 2006 and was inducted to the Hall of Fame in 2016. Tarik Glenn was selected 19th overall and was also named to three Pro Bowls. Walter Jones, who made nine Pro Bowls (including eight consecutive from 2001 to 2008), was a seven time All-Pro, and was inducted to the Hall of Fame in 2014, was selected sixth overall. Others include Chris Naeole, Dan Neil, Ryan Tucker, Jeff Mitchell, Mike Flynn, and Joe Andruzzi.

The 1997 Draft is also known for its running backs. Warrick Dunn, Corey Dillon, and Tiki Barber each rushed for over 10,000 yards in their careers, and Antowain Smith, and Duce Staley all enjoyed productive seasons in the NFL. This draft is also well known for its undrafted Pro Bowl players, including Jake Delhomme, Priest Holmes, and Pat Williams.

Player selections

Notable undrafted players

 

|}

Hall of Famers

 Walter Jones, offensive tackle from Florida State University taken 1st round 6th overall by the Seattle Seahawks. 
inducted: Pro Football Hall of Fame class of 2014.

 Orlando Pace, offensive tackle from Ohio State University taken 1st round 1st overall by the St. Louis Rams. 
inducted: Pro Football Hall of Fame class of 2016.

Jason Taylor, defensive end from University of Akron taken 3rd round 73rd overall by the Miami Dolphins.
inducted: Pro Football Hall of Fame class of 2017.

Tony Gonzalez, tight end from University of California taken 1st round 13th overall by the Kansas City Chiefs.
inducted: Pro Football Hall of Fame class of 2019.

Ronde Barber, cornerback from University of Virginia taken 3rd round 66th overall by the Tampa Bay Buccaneers.
inducted: Pro Football Hall of Fame class of 2023.

Trades
In the explanations below, (D) denotes trades that took place during the 1994 Draft, while (PD) indicates trades completed pre-draft.
Chicago bears
Round one

Round two

Round three

Round four

Round five

Round six

Round seven

References

External links
 NFL.com – 1997 Draft
 databaseFootball.com – 1997 Draft
 Pro Football Hall of Fame

National Football League Draft
NFL Draft
Draft
Madison Square Garden
NFL Draft
NFL Draft
American football in New York City
1990s in Manhattan
Sporting events in New York City